Old Woman Creek National Estuarine Research Reserve is the smallest reserve in the National Estuarine Research Reserve System at . It is one of two Great Lakes-type, freshwater estuaries in the system; the other being Lake Superior National Estuarine Research Reserve. Located in Erie County, Ohio near Sandusky, the reserve features freshwater marshes, swamp forests, a barrier beach, upland forest, estuarine waters, stream and nearshore Lake Erie.  Photographic atlases containing descriptions and identifications of many of the invertebrates found at Old Woman Creek have been prepared by Dr. Kenneth Krieger of the National Center for Water Quality Research at Heidelberg University.

References
Old Woman Creek National Estuarine Research Reserve

External links
Old Woman Creek Reports Heidelberg University

Protected areas of Ohio
National Estuarine Research Reserves of the United States
Protected areas of Erie County, Ohio
Nature reserves in Ohio
Bodies of water of Ohio
Estuaries of the United States
Rivers of Erie County, Ohio
Tributaries of Lake Erie
Bodies of water of Erie County, Ohio